Herbie Mann Returns to the Village Gate is a live album by American jazz flautist Herbie Mann recorded in 1961 for the Atlantic label but not released until 1963.

Reception

AllMusic awarded the album 3 stars with its review by Scott Yanow stating "This release, a follow-up to his hit At the Village Gate (two songs are from the same gig while three others actually date from seven months earlier), features Mann in an ideal group ...blending in the influence of African, Afro-Cuban and even Brazilian jazz. Worth searching for".

Track listing
All compositions by Herbie Mann except as indicated
 "Bags' Groove" (Milt Jackson) - 8:34 	
 "New York Is a Jungle Festival" - 9:53
 "Candle Dance" - 5:30
 "Bedouin" - 7:48
 "Ekunda" - 4:43
Recorded at the Village Gate in NYC on April 26 (tracks 3-5) and November 17 (tracks 1 & 2), 1961

Personnel 
Herbie Mann - flute
Dave Pike - vibraphone, marimba (tracks 3-5)
Hagood Hardy - vibraphone (tracks 1 & 2)
Ahmed Abdul-Malik (tracks 1 & 2), Knobby Totah (tracks 3-5)- bass
Rudy Collins - drums
Chief Bey (tracks 1 & 2), Ray Mantilla, Ray Barretto (tracks 3-5) - percussion

References 

1963 live albums
Herbie Mann live albums
Albums produced by Nesuhi Ertegun
Atlantic Records live albums
Albums recorded at the Village Gate